Terminalia arostrata, commonly known as crocodile tree or nutwood, is a tree of the family Combretaceae native to northern parts of Australia.

It blooms between July and November producing white, orange and red flowers. The tree has a rounded crown and pendulous branches and produces edible seeds.

The species was first described by botanists Alfred James Ewart and O.B.Davies in 1917 in The Flora of the Northern Territory.

It is found on flat to slightly undulating places in swampy areas and on basaltic plains in the Kimberley region of Western Australia, the Northern Territory and Queensland growing in alluvium and heavy soils.

References

Trees of Australia
Flora of Western Australia
Flora of Queensland
Flora of the Northern Territory
Plants described in 1917
arostrata